Jasen may refer to:

People
 Jasen (name)
 Jasen Mesić (born 1972), Croatian politician
 Karima Jasen

Places
 Jasen, Domžale, a village in the Municipality of Domžale, central Slovenia
 Jasen, Ilirska Bistrica, a village in the Municipality of Ilirska Bistrica, southwestern Slovenia
 Jasen (Ilidža), a village in Bosnia and Herzegovina
 Jasen (Trebinje), a village in Bosnia and Herzegovina
 Jasen, Montenegro
 Jasen (reserve), a nature reserve in Macedonia

See also
 Jasenov (disambiguation)